Carmen Vallejo (La Plata, Argentina, November 26, 1922 Buenos Aires, Argentina, was an Argentinian actress and comedian.

Biography
Vallejo began her career in theater and later debuted on radio. She was married to musician Oscar Aleman, with whom she performed on television throughout 1960s and 1970s. Later in her career, Vallejo held roles in several television series, such as Poné a Francella, Gasoleros and La Niñera.  In 1999 Vallejo was honored by the Argentine Senate with the Honorable Achievement Award.  In 2009 she was declared an Illustrious Citizen of Buenos Aires.  At that time, there were over one hundred television programs and sixty plays to Vallejo's credit.

References

1922 births
2013 deaths
People from Buenos Aires
Illustrious Citizens of Buenos Aires
Argentine film actresses
20th-century Argentine actresses